Historical realism is a writing style or subgenre of realistic fiction centered on historical events and periods.

External links
 Historical Realism as a worldview

Literary realism